"Chapter 2" (or "Episode 102") is the second episode of the first season of the American political thriller drama series House of Cards. It premiered on February 1, 2013, when it was released along with the rest of the first season on the American streaming service Netflix.

Plot
Frank (Kevin Spacey) is still sitting on the terrace of Freddy's, enjoying his first step to securing his revenge. He is off to meet part of the Democratic leadership for breakfast, where they discuss their course of action on how to handle the poorly-received education bill. They are interrupted by Remy Danton (Mahershala Ali), a former press secretary-turned-corporate lobbyist, who reminds Frank that his main client, SanCorp, has heavily invested in him. Meanwhile, Doug (Michael Kelly) finds something on Senator Michael Kern (Kevin Kilner), President Walker's nominee for Secretary of State, but Frank refuses to use it. After leaking the draft of the education bill, Frank secures control of the legislation and lures Donald (Reed Birney) into becoming his scapegoat. Claire (Robin Wright) continues downsizing her staff at the Clean Water Initiative.

Frank arranges a meeting with Zoe (Kate Mara) and hands her an editorial from a student newspaper in which Kern had denounced the Israeli occupation of the West Bank as illegal. Despite reservations, Zoe and her editors decide to publish. During an interview with George Stephanopoulos, Kern is confronted with an advance copy of Zoe's article. Furthermore, Stamper manages to locate Roy Kapeniak (T.J. Edwards), Kern's former co-editor of the student newspaper. Frank decides to send Russo (Corey Stoll) to talk with Kapeniak, who reveals that it was actually his article, not Kern's. Russo asks him to lie about it and say that Kern wrote it. Barnes runs the story linking Kern to the editorial, ending his nomination. With everything already planned, Frank contacts Durant and has Barnes leak the senator's (Jayne Atkinson) name as Kern's replacement in order to fuel early media speculation. Durant leads the polls and thus wins Vazquez's and Walker's support. Frank provides subtle affirmation of the choice.

Cast

Main cast 
 Kevin Spacey as U.S. Representative Francis J. Underwood 
 Robin Wright as Claire Underwood, Francis' wife
 Kate Mara as Zoe Barnes, reporter at The Washington Herald
 Corey Stoll as U.S. Representative Peter Russo
 Michael Kelly as Doug Stamper, Underwood's Chief of Staff
 Sakina Jaffrey as Linda Vasquez, White House Chief of Staff
 Kristen Connolly as  Christina Gallagher, a congressional staffer
 Constance Zimmer as Janine Skorsky, reporter 
 Sebastian Arcelus as Lucas Goodwin, editor and reporter at The Washington Herald
 Boris McGiver as Tom Hammerschmidt, editor-in-chief for The Washington Herald

Recurring characters

 Elizabeth Norment as Nancy Kaufberger
 Mahershala Ali as Remy Danton  
 Rachel Brosnahan as Rachel Posner
 Reg E. Cathey as Freddy Hayes
 Kevin Kilner as Michael Kern
 Jayne Atkinson as Catherine Durant
 Francie Swift as Felicity Holburn
 Chance Kelly as Steve
 Reed Birney as Donald Blythe
 Maryann Plunkett as Evelyn
 Chuck Cooper as Barney Hull
 Michael Siberry as David Rasmussen

Guest characters
 Morrie Kraemer as Dennis Mendel  
 TJ Edwards as Roy Kapeniak

Reception
The episode received positive reviews from critics. Boston Globe Matthew Gilbert noted that "the first two episodes were expertly directed by David Fincher" and Spacey's harmonious cadence such as those used in the first scene of this episode "makes even his character's mercy killing of an injured dog—which he does by hand—seem a little less brutal." Ryan McGee of The A.V. Club  said, "No actor, even one as skilled and charismatic as Spacey, can maintain interest with stakes this low over the long haul. For House of Cards to move to the next level, things have to stop being easy. They have to start getting hard. If the show does that, what's merely good right now should leap into the level of greatness."

Notes

External links
 House of Cards on Netflix
 

2013 American television episodes
House of Cards (American TV series) episodes